Aranmula is a temple town in the state of Kerala, India. It is known as the cultural capital of Pathanamthitta district, located at a distance of around 116 km from Trivandrum, the capital of Kerala, it is situated on the banks of the river Pampa. A centre of pilgrimage from time immemorial and a trade post of eminence, when the river was the chief means of transport, it is near Kozhenchery in Pathanamthitta District. It is easily accessible from Thiruvalla & Chengannur railway stations.It is located around 14 km from Thiruvalla City Centre.

Tourism
Aranmula is famous for the tourist attraction 'Vallam Kali', (Snakeboat regatta). Aranmula is a global heritage site enlisted by the United Nations. It is a sacred site for the Hindus and comprises the central temple of Lord Parthasarathi with a network of temples and sacred groves around. Boat race is part of the temple festival here. The boat race is conducted on day of Uthrittathi in the month of Chingam

Being a Vishnu temple in close proximity to Sabarimala means that during every Sabarimala season, Aranmula becomes a veritable hotspot for religious tourism.

Geography
Fertile wetlands, locally called Puncha, rich biodiversity and a soothing climate make Aranmula an apex model of the ecofriendly culture of Kerala. The region, as remote sensing maps show, has a rich stock of ground water which feeds the river Pampa and the estuaries like Vembanad. The rice producing belts like Kuttanad downstream benefit from the water cycle.  Nearby important towns are Chengannur (10 km), Pathanamthitta (15 km), Pandalam (14 km). The nearest railway station is Chengannur and airports are in Kochi and Thiruvananthapuram.

Geographic Coordinates

Temples

The Aranmula Parthasarathi Temple is one of the major temples in Kerala and has a great antiquity. It is one of the venerated 108 Vaishnava temples in India and finds mention in Tamil classics. Spread over a vast area, the temple is on the banks of the Pampa and the whole temple complex is at a high elevation. Main idol is of Lord Krishna, who is the charioteer of warrior Arjuna in Kurukshetra War. The temple has a flight of 18 steps that lead to the Eastern Tower while 57 descending steps from the Northern tower reaches the Pampa. The temple here has fine murals from the 18th century."Thanka Anki", the golden ornaments of Lord Ayyappa at Sabarimala is kept in Aranmula sri parthasarathy temple.

Pulikkunnumala Mahadeva Temple

Pulikkunnumala Mahadeva Temple is 4 km from Aranmula. The old temple is traditionally said to be the worship place of the pandavas. This temple is donated by Koikkattumalayil the late Ramakrishna Pillai to the Kshetra Samrakshana Samiti, Kerala.

Palace Aranmula Kottaram

Aranmula Panchayat

Shija T Toji is the panchayat president while NS Kumar (Makkan)is the vice-president.

Politics
Aranmula Assembly constituency is part of Pathanamthitta (Lok Sabha constituency). Smt Veena George is the present MLA of the constituency.

Environmental movements

The Ministry of Civil Aviation of the Government of India has issued a letter dated 25 May 2015 withdrawing the ‘in-principle’ approval to the proposed Aranmula Airport Project. The Civil Aviation Ministry has also forwarded copies of the letter withdrawing the approval for the airport project to the Prime Minister's Office, Rashtrapathi Bhavan, Ministry of Home Affairs, Defence Ministry, Planning Commission, Departments of Economic Affairs and Revenue, and the Project Monitoring Group at Vigyan Bhavan in New Delhi. Prior to this, on 8 May 2015, the Ministry of Defence withdrew the No Objection Certificate (NOC) to the project.  Earlier, on 28 May 2014, the National Green Tribunal (NGT) had cancelled the environment clearance granted to the project by the Union Ministry of Environment and Forests.

Notable people
 Sugathakumari, poet

See also 
 Aranmula Boat Race
 Aranmula Kannadi
 Aranmula kottaram
 Aranmula International Airport

References

External links

aranmula.net aranmula.co.in
Aranmula Village is chosen as the best district in Kerala
Controversy surrounding the private airport project in Aranmula
Aranmula Heritage Village
Manorama News: Aranmula - Wonders of Kerala

 
Villages in Pathanamthitta district